Stanhope is a small urban civil parish and neighbourhood of Ashford in the Ashford borough of Kent, England. It is a residential estate built in the 1960s on the southern edge of the town. It is currently the subject of phased re-development and its population, as such, grew by 235 in the ten years from 2001 accompanied by a mixture of new and replacement housing.

Re-development
The complete Stanhope regeneration project, planned and developed since 1999, is a £200 million PFI (Private Finance Initiative) whereby the private sector partner is responsible for maintaining amenities and rebuilding housing stock over 30 years.  The cornerstone of the scheme is to demolish all of the 410 flats on the estate and replace them with more than 400 mixed-type new homes. The new homes are a mix of rented housing, owned and managed by a housing association, shared ownership and houses for private, outright sale. 

The estimated remaining 300 or so council-owned houses will be renovated and all of the building work will be carried out in the first five years of the contract. Ideas for improving the area were raised by local people during a Planning for Real community exercise held in 2000. The initial demolition was carried out by the Council in October 2004.

Demography 

At the 2001 UK census, the Stanhope electoral ward had a population of 3,276. The ethnicity was 94.2% white, 1.4% mixed race, 1.6% Asian, 1% black and 1.8% other. The place of birth of residents was 93.5% United Kingdom, 0.7% Republic of Ireland, 0.9% other Western European countries, and 4.9% elsewhere. Religion was recorded as 65.9% Christian, 0% Buddhist, 0% Hindu, 0% Sikh, 0% Jewish, and 3.1% Muslim. 21.2% were recorded as having no religion, 0.3% had an alternative religion and 9.5% did not state their religion.

The economic activity of residents aged 16–74 was 38.3% in full-time employment, 12% in part-time employment, 4.3% self-employed, 6.8% unemployed, 2.6% students with jobs, 4% students without jobs, 6.9% retired, 13.1% looking after home or family, 8.1% permanently sick or disabled and 3.9% economically inactive for other reasons. The industry of employment of residents was 21.2% retail, 18% manufacturing, 9.6% construction, 8.4% real estate, 11.6% health and social work, 5.6% education, 7.9% transport and communications, 2.6% public administration, 4.9% hotels and restaurants, 2.3% finance, 2.1% agriculture and 5.8% other.
Compared with national figures, the ward had a relatively high proportion of workers in agriculture, retail, manufacturing and construction. There were a relatively low proportion in finance, real estate, education and public administration. Of the ward's residents aged 16–74, 7% had a higher education qualification or the equivalent, compared with 19.9% nationwide.

History 
The parish was formed in 1987 from the parish of Kingsnorth and part of the unparished area of Ashford.

References

External links
Statistical civil parish overview - map

Populated places in Kent
Civil parishes in Kent
Borough of Ashford